The Caribbean region of Colombia or Caribbean coast region is in the north of Colombia and is mainly composed of 8 departments located contiguous to the Caribbean. The Caribbean region of Colombia is home to approximately 9 million residents according to the Colombian Census 2005.

The Caribbean region coast extends from the Gulf of Urabá to the Gulf of Venezuela. Straddling the coast are Colombia's two main Atlantic port cities of Barranquilla and Cartagena. The administration of the region is covered by 8 department governments: Atlántico, Bolívar, Cesar, Sucre, Córdoba, Magdalena, La Guajira and San Andrés and Providencia. These 8 departments also cover approximately 182 municipalities, 1093 corregimientos and 493 caserios according to the 2005 Census by DANE Colombia. Most of its inhabitants speak a dialect of Caribbean Spanish with variations within its subregions.

Administrative divisions

Eight departments form the Caribbean region:

Partial territory pertaining to:

 Antioquia Department: in the Gulf of Urabá most of the territory of the subregion of Urabá Antioquia.
 Chocó Department: covering a small territory in the Gulf of Urabá. Chocó is the only Department of Colombia with coasts on both the Atlantic and Pacific oceans.

Demographics
It is considered the only tri-racial region, giving it the status of the most diverse and mixed region in the country, as the predominant ethnic group in the region is the Pardo, a mixture of European, mainly Spanish, the indigenous peoples and Afro-Colombian unlike the other regions, where predominantly White, Castizo and Mestizo of Colombia such as Andean Region and Orinoquia Region and black as is the case of the Pacific Region. During the 19th and 20th century, a wave of immigrants came from Europe and the Middle East, mostly from Lebanon, Italy, Germany, France, Syria, Palestine . A second wave followed during World War II from other parts of Europe such as Lithuania, Russia, Ukraine, Poland, Austria, Hungary, the Netherlands, Romania, Belgium, Armenia, Croatia and Jews from other countries affected by the war. There were also important settlements of British, White Americans, and Canadians who founded dozens schools such as Marymount International School Barranquilla, Colegio Karl C. Parrish, Colegio Jorge Washington, Colegio Albania, Colegio Británico de Cartagena, Colegio Británico de Monteria, Altamira International School, British International School Barranquilla, Boston International School Barranquilla, American School Barranquilla, Bureche School of Santa Marta, and Cartagena International School among many others across the region. Most of the immigrants settled in the main urban centers or trade port towns such as in Barranquilla, Santa Marta, Cartagena, Monteria, Sincelejo, Santa Cruz de Mompox, Santa Cruz de Lorica, El Banco, etc. The two most populous indigenous ethnic groups are the wayuu in the Guajira Peninsula and the Arhuacos, Koguis and Arsarios. Black population is mostly concentrated near Cartagena predominantly in the town of San Basilio de Palenque, which was proclaimed Masterpiece of the Oral and Intangible Heritage of Humanity by UNESCO for preserving its African heritage.

Economy
The economy of the Caribbean region is based mainly in the exploitation of natural resources such as coal and natural gas, salt, agricultural products mainly bananas, coffee and oil palm, cotton, tropical fruits among many other products, livestock raising which is practiced extensively in almost all the territory, in Córdoba, Sucre, Atlántico, Magdalena, Bolívar, Cesar and southern La Guajira. There is also a service industry and a local import-export industry, mainly in the ports of Cartagena, Barranquilla, and Santa Marta. Another major part of the economy is tourism, which concentrates also in Cartagena and Santa Marta along with San Andres and Providencia Islands.

Culture

Sports
Like in the rest of Colombia, football is by far the most popular sport in the zone, with teams like Junior Barranquilla, Jaguares de Córdoba, Real Cartagena and Unión Magdalena competing in the first and second  divisions of the country. The Caribbean region has been the home of successful football players, many of them world famous like Carlos Valderrama, Radamel Falcao and Carlos Bacca.

Unlike in rest of the country, but shared with Venezuela, baseball is an important sport in the region, although its popularity has been fading in the last few years. Nevertheless, the region has produced major league players like Édgar Rentería and Orlando Cabrera.

The region also is known for its love of combat sports. Boxing is a popular sport in certain zones and the region had produced many world champions, such as Antonio Cervantes, Rodrigo Valdéz, and Miguel "Happy" Lora.

Music and dance

The most popular local rhythms are the cumbia and vallenato however, there is a great musical influence from the rest of the Caribbean nations with Salsa, merengue, more recently reggaeton and many Afro-Caribbean rhythms. This influence also developed the Champeta which has similarities with reggaeton. Other genres include porro.

Traditional dances are mostly of Afro-Colombian origin with the influence in cumbia and the mapalé.

Myth and legend
The Caribbean region has a rich tradition of myths and legends that include La Llorona, El Hombre Caimán, La Ciguapa, the Vallenato Legend, La Madre Monte, El Simborcito, la Mojana Legend, El Lucio, etc.

Celebrations
The most popular and known celebration in the Caribbean region is the Carnival of Barranquilla celebrated every year in February or March. The Miss Colombia Pageant in Cartagena, the Vallenato Legend Festival in Valledupar, Feast of the Sea in Santa Marta and the Corralejas Festivities in Sincelejo.

Cuisine
The typical food of the Caribbean region  varies according  to the geographical location in the sabanas the typical meal is the sancocho made with  rabo (cow's tail) and accompanied with coconut rice. In the coast, the typical meal is fish, sometimes fried or sometimes cooked in coconut milk. A popular soup is also prepared with the head of the tarpon, yuca, plantain, coconut milk, lime, and salt. The arepa is also a popular dish with numerous variations like arepa limpia (plain arepa), arepa e' queso (arepa with cheese) and arepa e'huevo (arepa with egg). Cazuela de mariscos, a seafood stew, is also a typical dish found in the region.

See also
 Caribbean natural region
 Caribbean South America
 Pacific region of Colombia

References

External links
  Luis Angel Arango Library: Colombian Caribbean